Carlos'n Charlie's  is a chain of casual dining Mexican restaurants, primarily located in Mexican and Caribbean tourist destinations.

Carlos is Carlos Anderson, founder of Grupo Anderson's, who died in a 1990 plane crash, and Charlie is Charles Skipsey, his business partner. The company, founded in 1963, says that their more than 50 restaurants makes it Mexico's largest restaurateur. In addition to Carlos'n Charlie's, Grupo Anderson's has the Señor Frog's chain, along with other similarly-branded restaurants/bars like Carlos O'Brians and El Squid Roe.

Carlos'n Charlie's restaurants averaged $3.6 million in 2005 with an average check of $22.50. They expected sales to grow from $105 million to $112 million in 2006. The company is headquartered in Cancún.

Locations

Mexico
 Acapulco
 Cancún
 Cozumel
 Cuernavaca
 Ensenada
 Playa del Carmen
 Saltillo
 San Ángel, Distrito Federal, Mexico City

United States
 West Palm Beach, Florida
 Las Vegas, Nevada

Former locations
 Manzanillo, Mexico
 Austin, Texas
 La Paz, Baja California Sur, Mexico
 Monterrey, Mexico
 Oranjestad, Aruba
 Lake Mary, Florida
 Myrtle Beach, South Carolina
 Chihuahua, Mexico
 Guatemala City, Guatemala
 New York, New York

The restaurant in Oranjestad, Aruba became a location of interest in the investigation of the disappearance of Natalee Holloway in 2005. Holloway was last seen leaving the establishment by her friends. Three years after Holloway's disappearance, the restaurant was closed and a nearby location in Palm Beach was opened under the sister brand of Señor Frog's.

References

External links

Restaurants established in 1963
Mexican restaurants
Regional restaurant chains
Restaurant chains in Mexico
Cancún
1963 establishments in Mexico